Morimondo (  or locally Marmond ) is a comune (municipality) in the Metropolitan City of Milan in the Italian region Lombardy, located about  southwest of Milan.

It is home to the Abbey of Morimondo.

References

External links
 Official website

Cities and towns in Lombardy